Hilo  is a census-designated place (CDP) and the largest settlement in Hawaii County, Hawaii, United States, which encompasses the Island of Hawaii. The population was 44,186 according to the 2020 census. It is the fourth-largest settlement in the state of Hawaii and largest settlement in the state outside of Oahu.

Hilo is the county seat of the County of Hawaii and is in the District of South Hilo. The city overlooks Hilo Bay and has views of two shield volcanoes, Mauna Loa, an active volcano, and Mauna Kea, a dormant volcano. Mauna Kea is the site of some of the world's most important ground-based astronomical observatories. The Hilo bay-front has been destroyed by tsunamis twice. The majority of human settlement in Hilo stretches from Hilo Bay to Waiākea-Uka, on the flanks of the volcanoes.

Hilo is home to the University of Hawaii at Hilo, ʻImiloa Astronomy Center, as well as the Merrie Monarch Festival, a week-long celebration, including three nights of competition, of ancient and modern hula that takes place annually after Easter. Hilo is also home to the Mauna Loa Macadamia Nut Corporation, one of the world's leading producers of macadamia nuts. Hilo is served by Hilo International Airport.

History

Around 1100 AD, the first Hilo inhabitants arrived, bringing with them Polynesian knowledge and traditions. Although archaeological evidence is scant, oral history has many references to people living in Hilo, along the Wailuku and Wailoa rivers during the time of ancient Hawaii. Oral history gives the meaning of Hilo as "to twist".

Originally, the name "Hilo" applied to a district encompassing much of the east coast of the island of Hawaii, now divided into the District of South Hilo and the District of North Hilo. When William Ellis visited in 1823, the main settlement there was Waiākea on the south shore of Hilo Bay. Missionaries came to the district in the early-to-middle 19th century, founding Haili Church.

Hilo expanded as sugar plantations in the surrounding area created jobs and drew in many workers from Asia. For example, by 1887, 26,000 Chinese workers worked in Hawai'i's sugar cane plantations, one of which was the Hilo Sugar Mill. At that time, the Hilo Sugar Mill produced 3,500 tons of sugar annually.

A breakwater across Hilo Bay was begun in the first decade of the 20th century and completed in 1929. On April 1, 1946, an 8.6-magnitude earthquake near the Aleutian Islands created a  tsunami that hit Hilo 4.9 hours later, killing 160 people. In response, an early warning system, the Pacific Tsunami Warning Center, was established in 1949 to track these killer waves and provide warning. This tsunami also caused the end of the Hawaii Consolidated Railway, and instead the Hawaii Belt Road was built north of Hilo using some of the old railbed.

On May 22, 1960, another tsunami, caused by a 9.5-magnitude earthquake off the coast of Chile that day, claimed 61 lives, allegedly due to the failure of people to heed warning sirens. Low-lying bayfront areas of the city on Waiākea peninsula and along Hilo Bay, previously populated, were rededicated as parks and memorials.

Hilo expanded inland beginning in the 1960s. The downtown found a new role in the 1980s as the city's cultural center with several galleries and museums opening; the Palace Theater reopened in 1998 as an arthouse cinema.

Closure of the sugar plantations (including those in Hāmākua) during the 1990s hurt the local economy, coinciding with a general statewide slump. Hilo in recent years has seen commercial and population growth.

Geography
Hilo is on the eastern and windward side of the island.

Climate 
Hilo has a tropical rainforest climate (Köppen: Af), with substantial rainfall throughout the year. Its location on the windward coast (relative to the trade winds), makes it the fourth-wettest city in the United States, behind the southeast Alaskan cities of Whittier, Ketchikan and Yakutat, and one of the wettest in the world. Rainfall in Hilo varies with altitude, with more at higher elevations. At some weather stations in upper Hilo the annual rainfall is above .

Hilo's location on the shore of the funnel-shaped Hilo Bay also makes it vulnerable to tsunamis.

Demographics

As of the census of 2020, 44,186 people lived in 16,225 households in the census-designated place.

The racial makeup was 32% Asian, 18.4% White, 10% Native Hawaiian & Pacific Islander, 0.8% African American, 0.1% American Indian & Alaska Native, 0.6% from other races, and 38.1% from two or more races. Hispanic or Latino of any race were 13% of the population.

21.1% of the households had children under the age of 18 living with them. The average household size was 2.71.

The age distribution was 21.1% under age 18, 4.5% under age 5, and 21.10% 65 or older. The percent of females are 51.1%.

The median household income on the 2020 census was $65,727.

Transport

Air
Hilo is served by Hilo International Airport, where Hawaiian Airlines, and Southwest Airlines operate.

Bus
Hilo is served by the county Hele-On Bus.

Maritime
Hilo is served by the Big Island's largest harbor, Hilo Harbor, which is on Hilo Bay.

Education

Hilo is home to a number of educational institutions, including two post-secondary institutions, the University of Hawaii at Hilo and Hawaii Community College, and the Hilo and Waiakea primary and secondary school districts. Charter schools in the area serve primary and secondary students.

Government 
Although sometimes called a city, Hilo is not an incorporated city, and does not have a municipal government. The entire island, which is between the slightly larger state of Connecticut and smaller Rhode Island in size, is under the jurisdiction of the County of Hawaii, of which Hilo is the county seat.

Hilo is home to county, state, and federal offices.

Economy

The oldest city in the Hawaiian archipelago, Hilo's economy was historically based on the sugar plantations of its surrounding areas, prior to their closure in the 1990s.

Tourism and events
While Hilo has a fairly significant tourism sector, it gets less than half the annual visitors as the western coast of the Big Island, which has much sunnier weather and significantly less rain, with sandy and swimmable beaches and numerous major resorts.

A main source of tourism in Hilo is the annual week-long Merrie Monarch Festival, the world's preeminent hula competition and festival, which brings in visitors and participants from all over the world. It is held in the spring of each year beginning on Easter Sunday.

The local orchid society hosts the largest and most comprehensive orchid show in the state, the annual Hilo Orchid Show, which has been presented since 1951 and draws visitors and entrants worldwide.

Hilo is home to Hawaii's only tsunami museum, mostly dedicated to the 1946 Pacific tsunami, and is notable for the banyan trees planted by Babe Ruth, Amelia Earhart and other celebrities. It is home to the Pana'ewa Rainforest Zoo, shopping centers, cafés and other eateries, movie theaters, hotels, restaurants, and a developed downtown area with a Farmers Market. Downtown Hilo is bounded approximately by the Wailuku River, Kamehameha Avenue, Ponahawai Street, and Kapiolani Street.

Corporations and science
The Mauna Loa Macadamia Nut Corporation is in Hilo, south of the main town off Hawaii Route 11, north of Keaau.

Hilo is home to most of the astronomical observatories on Mauna Kea as well as the ʻImiloa Planetarium and Museum.  Astronomy has an economic impact of $100 million annually on the island. Astronomy on Mauna Kea was developed at the invitation of the Hawaii Chamber of Commerce following the collapse of the sugar cane industry.

Culture
 East Hawaii Cultural Center
 Lyman House Memorial Museum
 Merrie Monarch Festival
 Pacific Tsunami Museum

Notables

 Rodney Anoai
 Matt Blair
 Keiko Bonk
 Ed Case
 Titus Coan
 Keenan Cornelius
 Glenn Cornick
 Kai Correa
 Wesley Correira
 Jennifer Doudna
 David McHattie Forbes
 Ryan Higa
 High Chiefess Kapiolani
 Keōua Kūahuula
 
 Harry Kim
 Kimberly Kim
 Darren Kimura
 Kinooleoliliha
 Robert Kiyosaki
 George Lycurgus
 Troy Mandaloniz
 George Naope
 Gerald Okamura
 B.J. Penn
 Benjamin Pitman
 Bob Shane
 William Herbert Shipman
 Kolten Wong

Points of interest

 Banyan Drive
 Coconut Island
 East Hawaii Cultural Center
 Haili Church
 Hawaii Tropical Botanical Garden
 Hilo Tropical Gardens
 Hoʻolulu Park
 ʻImiloa Astronomy Center
 James Kealoha Beach Park
 Kalakaua Park
 Liliuokalani Park and Gardens
 Lower Waiakea Mountain Bicycle Park
 Lyman Museum
 Mauna Loa Macadamia Nut Corporation
 Mokupāpapa Discovery Center for Northwestern Hawaii's remote coral reefs
 Nani Mau Gardens
 Naha Stone (associated with Kamehameha I) in front of the Hilo Public Library
 Pacific Tsunami Museum
 Pana'ewa Rainforest Zoo
 Prince Kuhio Plaza
 Rainbow Falls (Waianuenue) & Boiling Pots on the Wailuku River
 University of Hawaii at Hilo Botanical Gardens
 Wailoa River State Recreation Area with King Kamehameha Statue

Media
Hilo is served by KWXX (94.7FM Hilo/101.5FM Kona), B93/B97 (93.1FM Kona/97.1FM Hilo), The Wave (KHBC 92.7FM Hilo), and KPUA (970AM Hilo) radio stations.

Public Access television is provided through Nā Leo TV.

The Hawaii Tribune-Herald, of Oahu Publications Inc., a subsidiary of Black Press, is Hilo's primary newspaper distribution company along with other newspapers like the Honolulu Star-Advertiser.

Sister cities
  Tauranga, New Zealand
  La Serena, Chile

Legacy
Asteroid (342431) Hilo is named after Hilo.

Hilo District

Hilo also referred to the District of Hilo when the Big Island was divided into six districts by the traditional moku land division. Hilo is now divided in two: North and South Hilo Districts.

North Hilo District
The District of North Hilo, along Hawaii State Highway 19 from north to south, encompasses the following unincorporated towns and localities:
 ʻŌʻōkala
 Laupāhoehoe and the Train Museum 
 Ninole
There are locations inland along State Highway 200 including Mauna Kea mountain road, Puu Huluhulu, and others.

South Hilo District
In the District of South Hilo, along State Highway 19, are the following unincorporated towns and localities:
 Honalo and the Akaka Falls
 Pepeekeo
 Wainaku
 Hilo Bay, the Wailuku River and the Rainbow Falls
 Hilo downtown: Pacific Tsunami Museum, etc.
Along State Highway 11 are:
 Hilo International Airport
 King Kuhio Shopping Center 
 Pana'ewa Rainforest Zoo
There are other locations. Along State Highway 200 and its extension are:
 Kaumana
 University of Hawaii at Hilo
 Puainako Shopping Center 
There are other locations.

References

Further reading

External links

 Pacific Tsunami Museum

 
County seats in Hawaii
Census-designated places in Hawaii County, Hawaii
Populated coastal places in Hawaii